Magnolia is a city in Pike County, Mississippi, United States. The population was 2,420 at the 2010 census. It is the county seat of Pike County, which lies within the McComb, Mississippi Micropolitan Statistical Area.

History
Magnolia was founded in 1856 by Ansel H. Prewett, a local civic leader and cotton planter. Knowing that the approaching New Orleans, Jackson, and Great Northern Railroad (now the Illinois Central Railroad) would need a station for water and fuel, Prewett sold a right-of-way to the railroad company – for one dollar, according to legend – and divided a section of his plantation into town lots, which he sold to investors. Prewett, while serving as temporary sheriff of Pike County, was killed by outlaws in the early 1870s escorting a prisoner on the very railroad that made Magnolia a viable community.

Magnolia grew rapidly in the 1860s, and in the late nineteenth century Magnolia served as a popular small-town resort for wealthy New Orleanians, who took trains north from New Orleans to enjoy Magnolia's fresh air and sparkling creeks. At one time early Magnolia boasted an opera house, skating rink, and several hotels that catered largely to these tourists.

In 1860 Magnolia's first newspaper, the Grand Trunk Magnolian, was established by John Waddill.  It did not last the war and was succeeded by the establishment of the Magnolia Gazette by J.D. Burke in 1872.  The Magnolia Herald was established by Luke W. Conerly in 1875 and he continued as its proprietor and editor until 1878.

Geography

Within the city limits there is the confluence of the Minnehaha River and the Little Tangipahoa River.

Demographics

2020 census

As of the 2020 United States Census, there were 1,883 people, 825 households, and 444 families residing in the city.

2000 census
As of the census of 2000, there were 2,071 people, 749 households, and 515 families residing in the city. The population density was 639.5 people per square mile (246.8/km2). There were 898 housing units at an average density of 277.3 per square mile (107.0/km2). The racial makeup of the city was 44.42% White, 53.84% African American, 0.43% Native American, 0.34% Asian, 0.29% from other races, and 0.68% from two or more races. Hispanic or Latino of any race were 1.16% of the population.

There were 749 households, out of which 31.2% had children under the age of 18 living with them, 38.1% were married couples living together, 24.7% had a female householder with no husband present, and 31.2% were non-families. 28.6% of all households were made up of individuals, and 15.1% had someone living alone who was 65 years of age or older. The average household size was 2.54 and the average family size was 3.08.

In the city, the population was spread out, with 24.4% under the age of 18, 12.3% from 18 to 24, 25.7% from 25 to 44, 22.2% from 45 to 64, and 15.4% who were 65 years of age or older. The median age was 36 years. For every 100 females, there were 97.1 males. For every 100 females age 18 and over, there were 94.5 males.

The median income for a household in the city was $21,190, and the median income for a family was $25,069. Males had a median income of $21,991 versus $18,839 for females. The per capita income for the city was $12,426. About 18.0% of families and 22.5% of the population were below the poverty line, including 30.1% of those under age 18 and 23.2% of those age 65 or over.

Notable people
Prentiss Barnes (12 Apr 1925-1 Oct 2006), bass singer in the doo-wop group The Moonglows. Inducted into the Rock and Roll Hall of Fame in 2000.
Aunjanue Ellis. Oscar-nominated actress.
Herman Neugass, track & field athlete who boycotted the 1935 Olympic trials
William W. Parsons (NASA) Director of the Kennedy Space Center, oversaw return to flight following the Space Shuttle Columbia disaster in 2003.
Michael Farris Smith, writer
Lynne Spears, author and mother of Bryan, Britney, and Jamie Lynn Spears.
Davion Taylor NFL Linebacker drafted by the Philadelphia Eagles, 3rd round, in 2020.

Transportation

Highways
  Interstate 55
  U.S. Highway 51
  Mississippi Highway 48

Air
 McComb-Pike County Airport

Services
The City of Magnolia is served by the South Pike School District. The town has one public library.

Recreation
 Percy Quin State Park
 Homochitto National Forest

Climate
The climate in this area is characterized by hot, humid summers and generally mild to cool winters.  According to the Köppen Climate Classification system, Magnolia has a humid subtropical climate, abbreviated "Cfa" on climate maps.

See also
Magnolia Depot

References

External links
 A Brief History of Magnolia by Lucius M. Lampton, MD

Cities in Mississippi
Cities in Pike County, Mississippi
County seats in Mississippi
Cities in McComb micropolitan area